Meis is a Spanish municipality in Pontevedra province.

Meis may refer to:

People
Dan Meis (born 1961), American architect
Fré Meis (1921–1992), Dutch trade unionist and communist politician
Sylvie Meis (born 1978), Dutch model and television personality

Other
 Meis (department store), a department store in Indiana
 Kastellórizo, a Greek island also known as Meis